The King of Legend (literally King Geunchogo) is a 2010 South Korean historical drama based on King Geunchogo of Baekje. Besides historical information from Samguk Sagi and Samguk Yusa, it was also inspired by a novel written by Lee Munyeol, a renowned Korean writer. The drama aired on KBS1 in Korea, and internationally through KBS World.

Synopsis
The drama tells the story of a warrior King of Baekje. Under his reign, the kingdom experienced its glory days, with military conquests that saw him controlling most of the Korean peninsula and a subsequent enhancement of Baekje's political power that was the greatest height of Baekje's power. The initial video references 2010 Seoul at the site of Pungnaptoseong then flashes back 1,700 years to Hanseong, Baekje ("Bakchi" as referred to in the English subtitles) in which the subject declares to make a new kingdom on that land near the West Sea. Yeogu, the ousted Prince, is banished to a life of selling salt to suppress any fears that he, being the second son, could attempt to take over the throne. The film about Yeogu’s return to the kingdom displays many epic war scenes with Goguryeo, who feels the kingdom was stolen from him and deceives Baekje.

This King is not Gwanggaeto but Baekje's King Geunchogo, who seized and ruled a Chinese region at least 60 years ahead of Gwanggaeto.

Cast
 Kam Woo-sung as Prince Buyeo Gu (Later as 13th Eoraha of Baekje, Geunchogo of Baekje)
 Kim Ji-soo as Buyeo Hwa
 Lee Jong-won as King Sayu or Gogugwon of Goguryeo (16th king of Goguryeo)
 Lee Ji-hoon as Hae Gun (Jwapyeong Hae Nyeong's Son)
 Ahn Jae-mo as Jin Seung (Jwapyeong Jin Jeong's Son)
 Lee Se-eun as Wi Hongran (Wi Birang's sister)
 Yoon Seung-won as King Biryu of Baekje (Geunchogo's father, 11th Eoraha of Baekje)
 Seo In-seok as Heukganggong Sahul (King Biryu's father)
 Choi Myung-gil as Haebi Hae Sosul (Biryu's 1st queen; Also known as Wanwoldang, Buyeo Chan's mother)
 Kim Do-yeon as Jinbi Jin Saha (Biryu's 2nd queen; also known as Sosukdang, Buyeo Gu's mother)
 Lee Jong-soo as Buyeo Chan (Crown Prince of Baekje)
 Lee Byung-wook as Buyeo Hwi (Wisagun Army Division Commander)
 Kim Tae-hoon as Buyeo San
 Han Jin-hee as King Gye (known as Buyeo Jun, son of 10th Eoraha of Baekje, King Bunseo, head of Wiryegung faction. Later proclaimed as the 12th Eoraha of Baekje)
 Ahn Shin-woo  as Buyeo Min
 Choi Ji-na as Seok Rahae (Buyeo Min's wife)
 Hwang Dong-Joo as Buyeo Mun
 Kim Bo-mi as So-Haebi (Buyeo jun's wife)
 Jung Woong-in as Wi Birang (Leader of Danbeomhoe; grandson of King Mayeo of Former Dongbuyeo (East Buyeo) Kingdom)
 Kang Sung-jin as Payun (Buyeo Gu's men)
 Kim Hyo-won  as Jwapyeong Jin Jeong (Leader of the Jin Clan)
 Kim Gi-bok as Jwapyeong Hae Nyeong (Leader of Hae Clan)
 Kim Hyeong-il as Jin Godo (Wisagun Division General)
 Jung Ui-Kap as Bu Gantae (Leader of Malgal Tribe)
 Kim Eung-soo as Jobul (Prime Minister of Goguryeo)
 Jeon Byung-ok as  General Ko Naja (Goguyreo Army Commander)
 Park Chul-ho as Ko Chisu (Goguryeo Army General)
 Won Seok-Yeon  as Sou (Goguryeo Minister)
 Kim Joo-young as Onjo (1st Eoraha of Baekje)
 Lee Deok-hwa as King Dongmyeongseong of Goguryeo (Go Jumong, 1st king of Goguryeo)
 Jung Ae-ri as Soseono (King Dongmyeongseong's 2nd consort, later founder of Baekje)
 Park Jung-woo as Yuri (later known as 2nd king of Goguryeo)
 Han Jung-soo as Bok Gugeom (Buyeo Gu's men. Later known as Mok Nageumja)
 Uhm Kyung-wan as Naman
 Jeon Gwang-jin as Sagi (Son of the late Dalsol Sa Chungseon)
 Hahm Eun-jung as Jin Ai (Jin Godo's daughter)
 Qri as Princess Buyeo Jin
 Lee In as Ajikai
 Park Geon-il as Soekkop (later known as Geungusu, 14th Eoraha of Baekje)
 Jung Hong-chae as Dugo (jamwa General, appointed as one of the Generals in the Baekje Army, and later known as Mok Gohae)
Jin Sung as Sosurim of Goguryeo
Jung Yoon-seok as young Go Gu-bu

Production notes
 Ungniha River (욱리하; 郁里河), mentioned in the drama is now known as Hangang River (한강;漢江) in Seoul.
 Hansan (한산,閑山)  is also one of the former names of Seoul,after Wiryeseong (위례성; 慰禮城-Baekje era),Hanyang (한양; 漢陽,-Goryeo era),Hanseong (한성; 漢城,-Joseon era),and Gyeongseong (경성; 京城,Japanese colonial era).
 The Seven-Branched Sword (칠지도, 七支刀, Chiljido in Korean), (七支刀, 七枝刀, shichishitō or nanatsusaya no tachi in Japanese) marks the friendly relationship between the Baekje Kingdom and Japan, during his reign.
 The title of the Kings in this drama differs, as Kings of Baekje were known as 'Eoraha', while Goguryeo is known as 'Taewang' (태왕,太王).
When he reclaimed  the throne of Baekje upon the death of King Gye in 346, it marks the end of the alternating kingship of two lines, and sealed the permanent ascendancy of the descendants of 5th Eoraha, King Chogo over those of 8th Eoraha, King Goi. It was reflected in his reign name,Geunchogo. The ascendancy lasted until the 31st and last the Eoraha of Baekje, King Uija when he surrendered when Baekje was conquered by Silla-Tang forces in 660.
 King Sayu, or Gogugwon of Goguryeo would be later killed by Geunchogo's son, Crown Prince Geungusu (later as 14th Eoraha of Baekje) when the Baekje Army captured Goguryeo's capital of Nampyeongyangseong (South Pyeongyang Fortress;present-day Pyongyang, North Korea).

Awards & nominations

References

External links
  
 
 
 

Korean Broadcasting System television dramas
2010 South Korean television series debuts
2011 South Korean television series endings
Television series by KBS Media
Korean-language television shows
Television series set in Baekje
Television shows based on South Korean novels
South Korean historical television series